Peccania is a genus of lichenized fungi within the family Lichinaceae. The genus contains three species.

References

Lichinomycetes
Lichen genera
Taxa named by Abramo Bartolommeo Massalongo
Taxa described in 1858